The Magellan Telescopes are a pair of  optical telescopes located at Las Campanas Observatory in Chile. The two telescopes are named after the astronomer Walter Baade and the philanthropist Landon T. Clay. First light for the telescopes was on September 15, 2000 for the Baade, and September 7, 2002 for the Clay. A consortium consisting of the Carnegie Institution for Science, University of Arizona, Harvard University, the University of Michigan and the Massachusetts Institute of Technology built and operate the twin telescopes. The telescopes were named after the sixteenth-century Portuguese explorer Ferdinand Magellan.

The Giant Magellan Telescope (GMT) is an extremely large telescope under construction, as part of the US Extremely Large Telescope Program.

Current instruments on the Magellan Telescopes 
Baade telescope: 
 Inamori Magellan Areal Camera and Spectrograph (IMACS)
 FourStar
 Folded port InfraRed Echellette (FIRE)
 Magellan Echellete (MagE)
Clay telescope: 
 Magellan Inamori Kyocera Echelle (MIKE) spectrograph
 Low-Dispersion Survey Spectrograph-3 (LDSS-3)
 Megacam imager
 MagAO
 Michigan/Magellan Fiber System (M2FS)

Magellan Planet Search Program 

This program is a survey of stars searching for planets using the MIKE echelle spectrograph mounted on the 6.5 m Magellan II (Clay) telescope.

MagAO Adaptive Optics System 

MagAO was originally intended for the Large Binocular Telescope (LBT), but the secondary mirror was damaged before it could be installed. The project leader Laird Close and his team were able to repair and repurpose the broken mirror for use on Magellan II. However, the edge of the mirror was broken.

Gallery

See also 
 List of largest optical reflecting telescopes
 Giant Magellan Telescope
 Gran Telescopio Canarias

References

External links 
 Magellan Project homepage – Carnegie Institution for Science
 Las Campanas Observatory Magellan Telescopes homepage

Infrared telescopes
Optical telescopes
Science and technology in Chile
Buildings and structures in Antofagasta Region